Bridge of Craigisla is a hamlet in Angus, Scotland. The bridge crosses the River Isla. This settlement lies along the B954 road.

References

Villages in Angus, Scotland